Okatovskaya is a rural locality (a village) in Tarnogskoye Rural Settlement, Tarnogsky District, Vologda Oblast, Russia. The population was 10 as of 2002.

Geography 
Okatovskaya is located 18 km northeast of Tarnogsky Gorodok (the district's administrative centre) by road. Nikonovskaya is the nearest rural locality.

References 

Rural localities in Tarnogsky District